ANSI C12.20 is an ANSI standard that describes an American National Standard for Electricity Meters - accuracy and performance.

The C12.20 standard established the physical aspects and performance criteria for a meter's accuracy class.  It refines certain details in ANSI C12.1 and ANSI C12.10.

The existing ANSI accuracy classes for electric meters are:
 Class .5 - having ± 0.5% accuracy.
 Class .2 - having ± 0.2% accuracy.
 Class .1 - having ± 0.1% accuracy.

Outside North America, IEC standards are used for electric meters.

See also 

 Electricity meter

Further reading
 ANSI C12.1, American National Standard for Electric Meters - Code for Electricity Metering
 ANSI C12.10, American National Standard for Physical Aspects of Watthour Meters - Safety Standard
 ANSI C12.18, American National Standard for Protocol Specification for ANSI Type 2 Optical Port

External links 
 The ANSI C12.20 standard at NEMA

Electrical standards
ANSI C12
Electric power distribution